Väinö Perttunen (12 September 1906 – 8 September 1984) was a Finnish wrestler. He competed in the men's Greco-Roman bantamweight at the 1936 Summer Olympics.

References

External links
 

1906 births
1984 deaths
Finnish male sport wrestlers
Olympic wrestlers of Finland
Wrestlers at the 1936 Summer Olympics
People from Kemi
Sportspeople from Lapland (Finland)